ENDF may refer to:
 Ethiopian National Defense Force
 Evaluated Nuclear Data File
 Escuela Nacional de Danza Folklórica